Minuscule 250 (in the Gregory-Aland numbering), O 10 (Soden), is a Greek minuscule manuscript of the New Testament, on parchment. Paleographically it has been assigned to the 11th century.

Scrivener labelled it by 264a, 337p. Gregory labelled it by 250a, 299p, and 121r.

Description 

The codex contains the text of the Book of Acts, Catholic epistles, Pauline Epistles, and Book of Revelation on 379 parchment leaves.

The biblical text is surrounded by a catena. The biblical text is written in one column per page and 20 lines in column, the text of commentary has 41 lines.

The Epistle to the Hebrews is placed after Epistle to Philemon.

It contains Synaxarion and the Euthalian Apparatus.

Text 

The Greek text of the codex is a representative of the Byzantine text-type. Aland placed it in Category V.

History 

The manuscript was brought from Greece.

It was examined by Bernard de Montfaucon, Matthaei, Paulin Martin, Franz Delitzsch, and Herman C. Hoskier (only Apocalypse).

The manuscript is currently housed at the Bibliothèque nationale de France (Coislin Gr. 224) in Paris.

See also 

 List of New Testament minuscules
 Biblical manuscript
 Textual criticism

References

Further reading 

 C. F. Matthei, Novum Testamentum Graece et Latine, (Riga, 1782-1788). (as v)
 Herman C. Hoskier, Concerning the Text of the Apocalypse, London 1929, vol. 1, pp. 556 ff.
 J. Neville Birdsall, A Byzantine Calendar from the Menology of two Biblical Manuscripts, Anal Boll 84 (1966), pp. 29–57.

Greek New Testament minuscules
11th-century biblical manuscripts